Charitraheen is a 1974 Bollywood drama film directed by Shakti Samanta. The film stars Sanjeev Kumar and Sharmila Tagore. The film was on the program of the cinema S. Gabriel in Lourenço Marques, Mozambique in May 1975. It is a remake of Bengali movie Kalankito Nayak(1970) starrer Uttam Kumar, Sabitri Chatterjee and Aparna Sen.

Cast
Sanjeev Kumar as Inder / Indrajeet Mukherjee
Sharmila Tagore as Rama / Rosy
Yogeeta Bali as Kamla Mukherjee 
G. Asrani as Debo / Devjeet Mukherjee
 Satya Banerjee as Rama's father
Dina Pathak as Inder's mother
Asit Sen as Mahavir kaka
Raza Murad as Inder's Lawyer
Utpal Dutt as Avinash's Lawyer
Madan Puri as Avinash
 Chandrashekhar as Ashok babu
 Arpana Chaudhary as Jamnabai Dancer
  Manmohan as Ajit Kumar Verma
 Jankidas as Sethji at Ramdas Kishandas & Co
  Murad as Judge
 Nandita Thakur as Kavita Mukherjee
 Leena D'Souza as Lead Dancer in song Teri meri yaari...
 Sujit Kumar as Mr.Khosla
 Anita Guha as Rama's mother
 Tyrone Aviet as a Dancer
 Sopariwala as Mr.Mehra
 Amol Sen as gatekeeper
 Baby Sabiha as Meenu
 Tarun Kumar Chatterjee as man drinking at Bar 
 Kanu Roy as Bade babu

Soundtrack
Lyrics by Anand Bakshi.

Trivia
When Sanjeev Kumar goes to Delhi after receiving telegram from Rosy, his family follows him. However, the scene is actually shot in Mumbai as one can see the Worli branch of State Bank of India when he walks out with Sharmila Tagore.

References

External links
 
Charitraheen Songs on Banglaalyrics

1974 films
1970s Hindi-language films
1974 drama films
Films directed by Shakti Samanta
Films scored by R. D. Burman
Hindi remakes of Bengali films
Indian courtroom films